"Freedom" is a 1995 song released on Mercury Records featuring a chorus of over 60 African-American female artists and groups of note in hip-hop, pop and R&B music including En Vogue, Aaliyah, Vanessa L. Williams, Mary J. Blige, MC Lyte, SWV, TLC, and Monica. It is a cover of Joi's song of the same name from her 1994 album The Pendulum Vibe. Both versions were produced by Dallas Austin and Diamond D.

Background
The all-star recording of both the song and solemn black-and-white video for "Freedom" took place directly after the American Music Awards of 1995. According to its promotional single's liner notes, the song was a tribute to women of the past like Harriet Tubman, Sojourner Truth, Rosa Parks, Coretta Scott King, Shirley Chisholm, and Angela Davis who played major roles in black resistance, as well as the empowerment of women of the present.

"Freedom" is a cover of a song originally performed by underground R&B singer Joi on her 1994 album The Pendulum Vibe. The song was re-recorded as the official theme for the award-winning film Panther. The song was produced by Dallas Austin and Diamond D, and reached the top twenty of the Billboard Hot 100 in 1995. The song featured established and up-and-coming female R&B and pop singers. The vocals were arranged by singer Angie Stone, and Me'Shell Ndegéocello contributed bass guitar.

A music video was also released to promote the song. It went top five on the MTV Jams countdown, and number two on BET's Coca-Cola Video Soul Top 20 weekly countdown.

Retail and promotional releases of the single also featured a rap-only version of the song featuring Salt-N-Pepa, Queen Latifah, Lisa 'Left Eye' Lopes of TLC, Yo Yo, MC Lyte, Da 5 Footaz, Patra, and Me'Shell Ndegéocello. The music video for this version was directed by Antoine Fuqua.

The single peaked at number 10 on Billboard's R&B Singles Chart and number 45 Pop, contributing to the success of soundtrack album on the charts (number 5, R&B Albums and number 37 Pop Albums).

Track listing

CD single
 Freedom (Theme From Panther) (4:30)
 Freedom (Theme From Panther) (Rap Version) (4:20)
 Freedom (Theme From Panther) (Edit) (4:04)

Vinyl single
 Freedom (Theme From Panther) (Diamond D's Crystal Mix) (6:06)
 Freedom (Theme From Panther) (The Black Bag Mix) (4:30)
 Freedom (Theme From Panther) (Dallas' Vocal Rap Mix) (4:30)
 Freedom (Theme From Panther) (Dallas' Dirty Half Dozen Mix) (5:08)
 Freedom (Theme From Panther) (Dallas' Clean Half Dozen Mix) (4:20)

Contributing artists

Aaliyah
Felicia Adams
May May Ali
MC Lyte
Amel Larrieux
Az-Iz
Blackgirl
Mary J. Blige
Tanya Blount
Brownstone
Casserine
Changing Faces
Tyler Collins
N'Dea Davenport
Da 5 Footaz
E.V.E. (Ebony Vibe Everlasting)
Emàge
En Vogue
Eshe & Laurneá (of Arrested Development)
Female
For Real
Penny Ford
Lalah Hathaway
Jade
Jamecia
Jazzyfatnastees
Queen Latifah
Billy Lawrence
Joi
Brigette McWilliams
Milira
Miss Jones
Cindy Mizelle
Monica
Me’Shell NdegéOcello
Natasha
Nefertiti
Patra
Pebbles
Pure Soul
Raja-Nee
Brenda Russell
SWV
Salt-N-Pepa
Chantay Savage
Sonja Marie
Tracie Spencer
Sweet Sable
TLC
Terri & Monica
Vybe
Crystal Waters
Caron Wheeler
Karyn White
Vanessa Williams
Xscape
Y?N-Vee
Zhané

References

External links
 
 

1995 singles
All-star recordings
Song recordings produced by Dallas Austin
Songs written by Dallas Austin
Joi (singer) songs
Songs about freedom
Music videos directed by Antoine Fuqua
Songs written by Diamond D